Socialist Alliance (in French: Alliance Socialiste) is a political coalition in Burkina Faso, consisting of the People's Movement for Socialism / Federal Party of Dr. Emile Paré and the  Unified Socialist Party of Benoît Lompo.
In the presidential election of 13 November 2005, its candidate Pargui Emile Paré won 0.87% of the popular vote.

Left-wing political party alliances
Political party alliances in Burkina Faso
Socialist parties in Burkina Faso